Bucquoy is a commune in the Pas-de-Calais department in the Hauts-de-France region in northern France.

The grounds, property of the Lords of Bucquoy, became a county in 1666 by request of Charles II.

Geography
A farming village located 12 miles (19 km) south of Arras on the D919 road, at the junction with the D8.

Population

Sights
 The church of St. Pierre, rebuilt, like most of the village, after destruction during World War I,
 The ruins of a 13th-century château.
 Queens Cemetery, for First World War allied casualties

See also
Communes of the Pas-de-Calais department

References

External links

 The CWGC cemetery
 The communal cemetery

Communes of Pas-de-Calais